The West Old Town Historic District, in or near Decatur, Alabama, is a historic district which was listed on the National Register of Historic Places in 2012.

It includes NW Alma Street to NW Vine Street.

It includes Modern Movement and Bungalow/craftsman architecture.

See also
East Old Town Historic District

References

External links

Historic districts on the National Register of Historic Places in Alabama
National Register of Historic Places in Morgan County, Alabama